Soldier Thakur Daler Singh is a 1969 Bollywood film starring  Ajit Singh Deol  Dharmendra, Deepa, Om Prakash, Mehmood.

Soundtrack
Music Director – Sonik Omi
Lyricist – Aziz Kashmiri
"Gore Gaalon Se Chilman Hata Lijiye" - Mohammed Rafi, Krishna Kalle
"Hum Hind Ke Mazdoor Kabhi Mar Nahi Sakte" - Mohammed Rafi
"Hum Ne Suna Tha Bada CharchaJanaab Ka" - Asha Bhosle
"Tum Ek Nazar Dekho To Idhar" - Asha Bhosle
"Zameen Ke Chaand Tere Dil MeinPyar Hai Ke Nahi" - Asha Bhosle

Crew
Producer – Pachhi
Cinematographer – S.S.Chaddha 
Music Director – Sonik Omi||

Lyricist – Aziz Kashmiri
Writer – Aziz Kashmiri
Editor – Surya Kumar

External links

Films scored by Sonik-Omi
1970 films
1970s Hindi-language films